Everybody Is Different : A Book for Young People Who Have Brothers or Sisters With Autism is a book by Fiona Bleach.

Overview
The book addresses questions that siblings of children on the autism spectrum may have. In addition to explaining in basic terms the characteristics of autism, it contains suggestions for making family life more comfortable.

Reception
It was reviewed by Intervention in School & Clinic,
It is number 10 on a list of top 10 autism books on the website Autism World. 
It is used by Children, Youth and Women's Health Service. 
It is used by The National Autistic Society
It was recommended about on Another Peace of the Puzzle.

References 

2005 non-fiction books
British books
Books about autism